Hans van Arum (born 23 December 1966) is a Dutch football coach and former professional player, appearing as a striker in over 200 games in the Eredivisie with Vitesse, Willem II and RKC Waalwijk.

Van Arum was head coach for AGOVV Apeldoorn in the Dutch Jupiler League, the interim head coach for SBV Vitesse in the Dutch Eredivisie, and head coach for the Houston Dutch Lions FC in the 2013 PDL season. In 2013 he is coaches SDV Barneveld in the Hoofdklasse.

References

1966 births
Living people
Dutch football managers
SBV Vitesse managers
AGOVV Apeldoorn managers
Dutch footballers
Sportspeople from Amersfoort
Association football forwards
Eredivisie players
SBV Vitesse players
RKC Waalwijk players
Willem II (football club) players
Rinus Michels Award winners
Dutch expatriate football managers
Footballers from Utrecht (province)
Expatriate soccer managers in the United States
Dutch expatriate sportspeople in the United States